Al Stewart (born September 5, 1983) is an American professional basketball player for the Moncton Magic of the National Basketball League of Canada (NBL).

High school career 
Stewart attended Manley Academy in Chicago, Illinois, where he played basketball under head coach Bo Delaney. He was a teammate of future NBA player Luther Head. His playing time increased after Head left the team. Stewart was known for being a strong ball-handler and became Manley's top point guard heading into his senior season. As a senior, he averaged 16.2 points, 12.1 assists and 4.9 rebounds, winning all-sectional honors. Stewart also earned All-Chicago Public School accolades two times.

College career 
Stewart played one season of college basketball at Southwestern Community College in Creston, Iowa. After his freshman season in the NJCAA, he averaged 14.3 points, 6.1 assists, 4.1 rebounds and 3.3 steals, and he shot 60% on field goals. Stewart was named first team All-ICCAC at the end of the season.

Personal life 
Stewart was born on September 5, 1983 in Chicago, Illinois to mother Cassandra Stewart. He has three brothers in Anthony, Darnell, Amir, and Jamil, and three sisters in Gabrielle Jayla, and Jessica. In early 2013, Stewart had a hiatus from professional basketball, leaving the Island Storm, to pursue a career as a teacher in the Chicago school system. He taught pre-kindergarten at Sherman Elementary School.

References 

1983 births
Living people
American expatriate basketball people in Canada
American men's basketball players
Basketball players from Chicago
Drake Bulldogs men's basketball players
Island Storm players
Junior college men's basketball players in the United States
London Lightning players
Moncton Magic players
Point guards
Saint John Mill Rats players